The Last Mingus Band A.D. is an album by drummer Dannie Richmond recorded in 1980 and originally released on the Gatemouth label as Dannie Richmond Quintet before being reissued on Landmark Records in 1994 with an additional track.

Reception

Allmusic reviewer Michael G. Nastos stated " Richmond has since passed away, leaving this great recording behind as a testament to his voracity and the enduring legacy of Mingus. Highly recommended". In JazzTimes, Bill Shoemaker wrote: "The Last Mingus Band A.D. is a strong album ".

Track listing
 "Cumbia and Jazz Fusion" (Charles Mingus) – 21:33
 "Feel No Evil" (Jack Walrath) – 5:01
 "April Denise" (Dannie Richmond) – 5:58
 "Seven Words" (Bob Neloms) – 7:59
 "Cumbia and Jazz Fusion" [Alternate Take] (Mingus) – 24:30 Additional track on reissue

Personnel
Dannie Richmond – drums
Jack Walrath – trumpet, flugelhorn
Ricky Ford – tenor saxophone, soprano saxophone
Bob Neloms – piano
Cameron Brown – bass

References

Landmark Records albums
Dannie Richmond albums
1980 albums
Albums recorded at Van Gelder Studio